David Adams (born 30 October 1930) is a former Australian politician. He was a Liberal member of the Australian Capital Territory House of Assembly for Canberra from 1982 to 1986, and unsuccessfully attempted to enter the Australian Capital Territory Legislative Assembly in 1989 as a National Party member.

References

1930 births
Living people
Liberal Party of Australia members of the Australian Capital Territory Legislative Assembly
Members of the Australian Capital Territory House of Assembly